Bixby High School is a public high school located in Bixby, Oklahoma. It is a part of Bixby Public Schools.

History
The first Bixby High School was built in 1908 with classes beginning in 1909.

Athletics

Teams
Bixby's athletic teams are nicknamed the Spartans and the school's colors are red and blue. Bixby teams compete in the following sports:

Band
Baseball
Boys basketball
Girls basketball
Cross country
Football
Boys golf
Girls golf
Boys tennis
Girls tennis
Boys soccer
Girls soccer
Softball
Boys swimming
Girls swimming
Track and field
Wrestling
Volleyball

State championships

Football
2014 6A-II Oklahoma Secondary School Activities Association State Champions
2015 OSSAA 6A-II State Champions
2016 OSSAA 6A-II State Champions
2018 OSSAA 6A-II State Champions
2019 OSSAA 6A-II State Champions
2020 OSSAA 6A-II State Champions
2021 OSSAA 6A-II State Champions
2022 OSSAA 6A-I State Champions

Demographics
Bixby High School enrolled 1,793 students during the 2018–19 school year. 1,258 were Caucasian, 192 were Hispanic, 175 were multiracial, 125 were American Indian/Alaskan Native, 24 were African American, and 19 were Asian.

Notable alumni
Cade Cavalli, first round selection in the 2020 MLB draft
Chris Harris Jr., NFL cornerback for the Los Angeles Chargers
Garry Porterfield, former NFL defensive end

References

External links
 Official site

Public high schools in Oklahoma
1909 establishments in Oklahoma
High schools in Oklahoma